Earl of St Germans, in the County of Cornwall, is a title in the Peerage of the United Kingdom that is held by the Eliot family. The title takes its name from the village of St Germans, Cornwall, and the family seat is Port Eliot. The earldom has the subsidiary title of Baron Eliot.

History
Edward Eliot represented St Germans, Liskeard and Cornwall in the House of Commons and served as a commissioner of the Board of Trade and Plantations. He was the son of Richard Eliot (died 1748) and his wife Harriot, illegitimate daughter of James Craggs the Younger by his mistress, the noted actress Hester Santlow. In 1784 he was created Baron Eliot, of St Germans in the County of Cornwall, in the Peerage of Great Britain. In 1789 he assumed by Royal licence the additional surname of Craggs. However, this surname has not been used by any of his descendants.

Lord Eliot's second but eldest surviving son, Edward James Eliot, pre-deceased him, and he was succeeded by his third son, John Eliot, 2nd Baron Eliot. In 1815 he was created Earl of St Germans with remainder to his younger brother the William Eliot and the heirs male of his body. He had earlier represented Liskeard in Parliament.

William, the second Earl, was a diplomat and politician, having notably served as Parliamentary Under-Secretary of State for Foreign Affairs. His only son, the third Earl, was also a prominent politician and held ministerial office as Chief Secretary for Ireland, Postmaster General, Lord-Lieutenant of Ireland and Lord Steward of the Household. His third but eldest surviving son, the fourth Earl, was in the Diplomatic Service and briefly represented Devonport in the House of Commons. In 1870 he was summoned to the House of Lords through a writ of acceleration in his father's junior title of Baron Eliot. He never married and was succeeded by his younger brother, the fifth Earl.

Henry, the fifth Earl, was in the Foreign Office for many years. This line of the family failed on the death of his second but eldest surviving son, the sixth Earl, in 1922. The late Earl was succeeded by his first cousin, the seventh Earl. He was the eldest son of Colonel Charles George Cornwallis Eliot, the sixth son of the third Earl. He never married and was succeeded by his younger brother, the eighth Earl. He held several positions at court, notably as Gentleman Usher to King Edward VII and King George V.

, the titles are held by the eleventh Earl, who succeeded his grandfather in 2016.

Barons Eliot (1784)

Edward Craggs Eliot, 1st Baron Eliot (1727–1804)
John Eliot, 2nd Baron Eliot and 1st Earl of St Germans (1761–1823)

Earls of Saint Germans (1815)
John Eliot, 1st Earl of St Germans (1761–1823)
William Eliot, 2nd Earl of St Germans (1767–1845)
Edward Granville Eliot, 3rd Earl of St Germans (1798–1877)
William Gordon Cornwallis Eliot, 4th Earl of St Germans (1829–1881)
Henry Cornwallis Eliot, 5th Earl of St Germans (1835–1911)
John Granville Cornwallis Eliot, 6th Earl of St Germans (1890–1922)
Granville John Eliot, 7th Earl of St Germans (1867–1942)
Montague Charles Eliot, 8th Earl of St Germans (1870–1960)
Nicholas Richard Michael Eliot, 9th Earl of St Germans (1914–1988)
Peregrine Nicholas Eliot, 10th Earl of St Germans (1941–2016)
Albert Eliot, 11th Earl of St Germans (born 4 November 2004)

The heir presumptive is the present Earl's uncle, the Louis Robert Eliot (b. 1968).

Line of succession

 Peregrine Nicholas Eliot, 10th Earl of St Germans (1941–2016)
Jago Nicholas Aldo, Lord Eliot (1966–2006)
 Albert Eliot, 11th Earl of St Germans (born 2004)
(1). Hon. Louis Robert Eliot (b. 1968)
(2). Hon. Francis Michael Eliot (b. 1971)

Family tree

Notes

References 
 Kidd, Charles, Williamson, David (editors). Debrett's Peerage and Baronetage (1990 edition). New York: St Martin's Press, 1990,

External links 

 The Eliot Family Tree
 Online catalogue for Eliot collection at the Cornwall Record Office

 
Earldoms in the Peerage of the United Kingdom
1815 establishments in the United Kingdom
Noble titles created in 1815
Noble titles created for UK MPs
Cornish nobility
 Earl